The Meetjesland is a historical region in the north-west of the province East Flanders in Belgium.

Etymology
There are many legends surrounding the origin of the name. The most known is the one of Emperor Charles V (Charles V) who was known for his sexual appetite. The story goes that when he traveled through the region people hid their daughters and their attractive young women, making emperor Charles think this region was full of old women (meetjes).

Geography
Due to its historical nature, "Meetjesland" is not a fixed region as such. Even so, it is widely accepted to comprise the following municipalities:

Aalter
Assenede
Eeklo
Evergem
Kaprijke
Knesselare
Lovendegem
Maldegem
Nevele
Sint-Laureins
Waarschoot
Wachtebeke
Zelzate
Zomergem

Eeklo is considered to be the capital of "Meetjesland".

Events
The official holiday of "Meetjesland" is celebrated on June 21.

External links

Areas of Belgium
Regions of Flanders
Geography of East Flanders
Eeklo